The R620 road is a regional road in County Cork, Ireland. It travels from the R619 at Dromahane to the N72 at Mallow.

References

Regional roads in the Republic of Ireland
Roads in County Cork